Josephine Joyce Lalam (born 12 November 2000) is a Ugandan javelin thrower.

She finished eighth at the 2018 Commonwealth Games, won the bronze medal at the 2018 African Championships, finished fourth at the 2019 African Games and won the gold medal at the 2019 African U20 Championships.

Her personal best throw is 53.39 metres, achieved at the 2019 African Games in Rabat. This is the Ugandan record.

References

1993 births
Living people
Ugandan javelin throwers
Commonwealth Games competitors for Uganda
Athletes (track and field) at the 2018 Commonwealth Games
African Games competitors for Uganda
Athletes (track and field) at the 2019 African Games
Islamic Solidarity Games competitors for Uganda
21st-century Ugandan women